Khimti I Hydropower Plant is a run-of-the-river hydroelectric power station with an installed capacity of 60 MW. The flow is 11.65 m3/s and head is 660m. This power station is underground located at Dolakha district of Nepal. The plant became fully operational on 2074-01-10 BS.

The plant is operated by Himal Power Limited.

References

Hydroelectric power stations in Nepal
Gravity dams
Run-of-the-river power stations
2017 establishments in Nepal
Buildings and structures in Dolakha District